Tongcheng may refer to the following places in China:

Tongcheng, Anhui (桐城市), county-level city
Tongcheng County, Xianning, Hubei
Tongcheng, Linquan County (同城镇), Anhui
Tongcheng, Tianchang (铜城镇), Anhui
Tongcheng, Shanxi (桐城镇), town in Wenxi County
Tongcheng Subdistrict, Fuding (桐城街道), Fujian
Tongcheng Subdistrict, Harbin (通城街道), in Acheng District
Tongcheng Subdistrict, Dong'e County (铜城街道), Shandong